Shir Shirzai (born 29 June 1993) is an Afghan cricketer. He made his first-class debut for Amo Region in the 2017–18 Ahmad Shah Abdali 4-day Tournament on 20 October 2017. He made his Twenty20 debut on 12 September 2020, for Amo Sharks in the 2020 Shpageeza Cricket League.

References

External links
 

1993 births
Living people
Afghan cricketers
Amo Sharks cricketers
Kabul Eagles cricketers
Place of birth missing (living people)